Mythimna albomarginata is a moth in the family Noctuidae. It is found in the Philippines, Borneo, Java and Taiwan.

Subspecies
Mythimna albomarginata albomarginata
Mythimna albomarginata rubea Yoshimatsu, 1994 (Taiwan)

References

Moths described in 1920
Mythimna (moth)
Moths of Borneo
Moths of Indonesia
Moths of the Philippines
Moths of Taiwan
Taxa named by Richard South